1968 is a 2018 historical-sports docudrama film directed by Tassos Boulmetis.

Plot

April 4th, 1968. The Panathenaic Stadium (then Olympic Stadium of Athens) is abuzz, with thousands of people gathered and millions listening through their radios. The FIBA European Cup Winners' Cup final between AEK B.C. – Slavia VŠ Praha has just begun and is attended by 80,000 spectators, the Guinness World Record attendance for a basketball event.

A girl in love is dreaming of her wedding day, while the future husband becomes more desperate with every Greek ball going through the hoop. An elderly husband and wife remember the home they left behind. A young communist prisoner cheers from his jail cell and a PROPO betting shop becomes the place where old and new wounds resurface.

Years before this night, three Constantinopolitans seeing Greek refugees from Constantinople arriving in Athens as part of the population exchange between Greece and Turkey following the Greco-Turkish War (1919–1922) decided to create an athletic union, eventually named AEK, that will tell their story. At the end of this night, Greek history will have changed forever.

Cast
 Ieroklis Michailidis as the maestro
 Antonis Kafetzopoulos as a Greek from Constantinople
 Giorgos Mitsikostas as a PROPO betting shop owner
 Stelios Mainas as the passenger
 Manolis Mavromatakis as bus officer
 Vasiliki Troufakou as Varvara
 Giannis Vouros
 Christos Dimas
 Orfeas Avgoustidis as Thanasis
 Themis Panou as the doctor
 Taxiarchis Chanos as a prison guard
 Alexandros Zouridakis as a prison guard
 Antonis Antoniou as the funeral home operator
 Errikos Litsis as the informer
 Thodoris Katsafados as Varvara's father
 Giorgos Souxes as a Greek from Constantinople
 Alexis Agrafiadis as a Greek from Constantinople
 Alexandros Amerikanos as Giorgos Amerikanos: Captain of AEK
 Alexandros Moukanos as the prisoner's father
 Maria Antoulinaki as Varvara's mother
 Antonis Kyriakidis as Lakis Tsavas
 Petra Mavridi as a schoolgirl
 Vasilis Georgiou as himself: Radio broadcaster of the event
 Christos Zoupas as himself: Former AEK player
 Nikos Milas as himself: Former AEK manager
 Lakis Tsavas as himself: Former AEK player
 Nikos Nesiadis as himself: Former AEK player
 Stelios Vasileiadis as himself: Former AEK player
 Eas Larentzakis as himself: Former AEK player
 Georgios Trontzos as himself: Former AEK player
 Petros Petrakis as himself: Former AEK player
 Jiří Zídek Sr. as himself: Former Slavia Praha player 
 Jiří Růžička as himself: Former Slavia Praha player 
 Bohumil Tomášek as himself: Former Slavia Praha player 
 Kyriakos Chinas as himself
 Nikolaos Ouzounoglou as himself
 Ntinos Belalidis as himself: Chairman of Kurtuluş S.K.
 Pepi Amerikanou as herself: Wife of former AEK captain Giorgos Amerikanos
 Gitsa Christea as herself: Wife of former AEK player Antonis Christeas
 Aristidis Kamaras as himself: Event spectator and former Panathinaikos F.C. footballer
 Giannis Ioannidis as himself: Event spectator and former AEK manager
 Theodoros Vamvakousis as himself: Event spectator and former Olympiacos B.C. player
 Ntinos Panagidis as himself: Event spectator
 Michalis Poulantzas as himself: Former AEK player

Release
The film was released in cinemas on January 25, 2018 by Feelgood Entertainment and opened number one at the Greek box office.

The film went to gross $853,512 at the Greek box office, making it the 24th highest grossing 2018 film in Greece.

Awards

References

External links
 
 

2018 films
Greek drama films
Films set in 1968
2010s sports films
Basketball films